Mongnawng (also known as Möngnawng or Maingnaung) was a large Shan state in what is today Burma.

Mongnawng was bound by Kengtung State in the east. The Nam Pang, an important river, crossed the state from north to south. Its capital was Mong Nawng.

History
Mongnawng became independent from Hsenwi in 1851 under the rulership of the myoza Heng Awn. It was a tributary of the Burmese Kingdom until 1887, when the Shan states submitted to British rule after the fall of the Konbaung dynasty.

Rulers
The rulers of Mongnawng bore the title of Myoza.

Myozas
1851 - 1866                Heng Awn                           (d. 1866)
1866 - 1868                Hkun Hkang                         (d. 1868)
1868 -  9 Aug 1906         Hkun Tun                           (b. 1858 - d. 1906)
 9 Aug 1906 - 19..         Hkun Long                          (b. 1851 - d. 19..)

References

Geography of Shan State